Santiago Arata Perrone (born 2  September 1996) is a Uruguayan rugby union player who generally plays as a scrum-half and represents Uruguay internationally.

He made his international debut for Uruguay against Canada on 6 February 2016. He was included in the Uruguayan squad for the 2019 Rugby World Cup which was held in Japan for the first time and also marked his first World Cup appearance.

On 28 May 2020, Arata signed a major professional contract with French side Castres in the Top 14 competition on a two-year deal from the 2020-21 season.

References

External links

1996 births
Living people
Expatriate rugby union players in the United States
Houston SaberCats players
Rugby union scrum-halves
Rugby union players from Montevideo
Uruguay international rugby union players
Uruguayan expatriate rugby union players
Uruguayan expatriate sportspeople in the United States
Peñarol Rugby players
Uruguayan expatriate sportspeople in France
Castres Olympique players
Expatriate rugby union players in France